Lady Emily Lutyens (née Bulwer-Lytton; 1874–1964) was an English theosophist and writer.

Life
Emily Lytton was born on 26 December 1874 in Paris, the daughter of Robert Bulwer-Lytton, 2nd Baron of Lytton (later The 1st Earl of Lytton) and Edith Villiers. She was brought up in Lisbon, India (where her father was Viceroy from 1876 to 1880) and Knebworth House, where she was educated by governesses.

From 1887 to 1891 she lived in Paris, where her father was British ambassador, and became a correspondent of the elderly Norfolk clergyman Whitwell Elwin. She returned to England after her father's death, and fell in love with Wilfrid Scawen Blunt, 35 years her senior:

She became the lifelong friend of Blunt's daughter, Judith (later Baroness Wentworth).

In 1897 she married the architect Edwin Landseer Lutyens. She had five children, including Mary Lutyens, the composer Elisabeth Lutyens and the painter Robert Lutyens. Lutyens interested herself in social and political questions, such as the state regulation of prostitution. She was a visitor to the local lock hospital, a member of the Moral Education League, and a supporter of women's suffrage. She introduced her older sister Lady Constance Bulwer-Lytton to the suffrage movement, though was herself opposed to militancy and resigned from the Women's Social and Political Union in 1909.

In 1910 she joined the Theosophical Society. She became a kind of surrogate parent to the young Krishnamurti, brought back from India with his brother by Annie Besant in 1911. Appointed by Besant as the English representative of the Order of the Star in the East, Lutyens toured the country lecturing on behalf of theosophy. She edited the theosophical journal Herald of the Star, and attracted wealthy converts to theosophy, such as Mabel Dodge. In 1916, at the same time as her husband was busy designing an imperial capital at New Delhi, she held meetings for an all-India home rule movement in her drawing-room in London. She continued to protect and care for Krishnamurti, to whom she was devoted. As a young adult Krishnamurti wrote to her daily from France. In the 1920s she toured the world with him, convinced that he was the Messiah. In 1925 she founded the League of Motherhood, but by this time theosophy was divided over Krishna's claims. She supported Krishnamurti trying to dissolve the Theosophical Society, and in 1930 followed him in resigning from theosophy.

In her eighties Lutyens published two autobiographical works: A Blessed Girl (1953) was a memoir of her upbringing, and Candles in the Sun (1957) told the story of her theosophical involvement. The Birth of Rowland (1956) was a collection of her parents' letters.

She died at her home in London on 3 January 1964, eight days after her 89th birthday.

Vegetarianism

Lutyens was a strict vegetarian. Historian Jane Ridley has noted that "Never a meat-eater, Emily became a doctrinaire vegetarian, subsisting on nut cutlets disguised as lamb with a piece of macaroni wrapped in a paper frill instead of a bone". Lutyens also raised her children on a vegetarian diet but her husband Edwin was a meat-eater. Lutyens was a vice-president of the Vegetarian Society.

Selected publications

 The Faith Catholic: Some Thoughts on the Athanasian Creed, 1918
 Theosophy as the Basic Unity of National Life. Being the Four Convention Lectures Delivered in Bombay at the Forty-Ninth Anniversary of the Theosophical Society, December, 1924, 1925
The Call of the Mother, 1926
 A Blessed Girl: Memoirs of a Victorian Girlhood Chronicled in an Exchange of Letters, 1887-1896, 1953
 The Birth of Rowland: an Exchange of Letters in 1865 between Robert Lytton and His Wife, 1956
Candles in the Sun, 1957, with Mary Lutyens

References

Further reading
 Jane Ridley, ed., The Letters of Edwin Lutyens to His Wife Lady Emily. London: Collins, 1985.
 Jane Ridley, The Architect and His Wife: a Life of Edwin Lutyens. London: Chatto & Windus, 2002.

1874 births
1964 deaths
British vegetarianism activists
Daughters of British earls
English feminists
English Theosophists
People associated with the Vegetarian Society
Wives of knights
Writers from Paris